David Ron Karger (born May 1, 1967) is a professor of computer science and a member of the Computer Science and Artificial Intelligence Laboratory (CSAIL) at the Massachusetts Institute of Technology.

Education
Karger received a Bachelor of Arts degree from Harvard University and a PhD in computer science from Stanford University.

Research
Karger's work in algorithms has focused on applications of randomization to optimization problems and led to significant progress on several core problems. He is responsible for Karger's algorithm, a Monte Carlo method to compute the minimum cut of a connected graph. Karger developed the fastest minimum spanning tree algorithm to date, with Philip Klein and Robert Tarjan. They found a linear time randomized algorithm based on a combination of Borůvka's algorithm and the reverse-delete algorithm. With Ion Stoica, Robert Morris, Frans Kaashoek, and Hari Balakrishnan, he also developed Chord, one of the four original distributed hash table protocols.

Karger has conducted research in the area of information retrieval and personal information management. This work has focused on new interfaces and algorithms for helping people sift effectively through large masses of information. While at Xerox PARC, he worked on the Scatter/Gather system, which hierarchically clustered a document collection and allow the user to gather clusters at different levels and rescatter them. More recently he has been researching retrieval systems that personalize themselves to best fit their individual users' needs and behaviors, leading the Haystack project. David Karger is also part of Confer: a tool for conference attendees used by many research conferences.

Awards
Karger's dissertation received the 1994 ACM doctoral dissertation award and the Mathematical Programming Society's 1997 Tucker Prize. He also received the National Academy of Sciences' 2004 Award for Initiative in Research.

Personal
Karger is married to Allegra Goodman, an American author. The couple live in Cambridge, Massachusetts and have four children, three boys and a girl.

References

1967 births
People in information technology
Living people
American computer scientists
Baalei teshuva
American Orthodox Jews
Jewish American scientists
Harvard University alumni
Stanford University alumni
Massachusetts Institute of Technology faculty
21st-century American Jews